The St. Louis Filmmakers Showcase (SLFS), an annual presentation of the nonprofit Cinema St. Louis, serves as the area's primary venue for films made by local artists. With advances in affordable digital filmmaking, more and more movies are being made in St. Louis and environs, but opportunities for moviegoers to see that work are scarce, because few of the films ever screen commercially. SLFS frequently provides the only chance area filmmakers have to display their talents on the big screen.

SLFS is held at the Tivoli Theatre in the vibrant Delmar Loop entertainment district. A carefully renovated art-deco theater from the 1920s with a 450-seat main auditorium, the Tivoli is regularly voted St. Louis' favorite theater in the Riverfront Times' annual "Best of St. Louis" poll. The event annually screens works that were written, directed, edited, or produced by St. Louis natives or those with strong local ties featuring 15-20 programs over five days, ranging from full-length fiction features and documentaries to multi-film compilations of fiction and documentary shorts. Highlights include post-screening talks with filmmakers, lively seminars on the moviemaking process, and a closing-night party at Blueberry Hill that features announcements of SLFS films chosen for inclusion in the St. Louis International Film Festival and awards given by the St. Louis Gateway Film Critics Association.

2008 Showcase Information

The showcase will be held Sunday-Thursday, July 19–24, 2008.

July 19: Filmmaking Seminar/Film Program, Regional Arts Commission, 6128 Delmar Blvd.

July 20–23: Film Programs, Tivoli Theatre

July 24: Closing-Night Awards Party, Blueberry Hill

Film festivals in Missouri